Seetha Kalyanam may refer to:

 Seetha kalyanam, a character in Hindu theology
 Seetha Kalyanam (1934 film), a 1934 Indian film, directed by Baburao Phendarkar
 Seeta Kalyanam (1976 film), a 1976 Telugu film directed by Bapu
 Seetha Kalyanam (2009 film), a 2009 Malayalam film directed by T. K. Rajeev Kumar
 Seetha Kalyanam (TV series), a 2018 Malayalam television series directed by Sunil Karyattukara